Dean Atta is a British poet of Greek Cypriot and Caribbean descent. He has been listed by The Independent newspaper as one of the 100 most influential LGBT people in the United Kingdom.  In 2012, his poem "I Am Nobody's Nigger", written in response to the use of the racial slur by the murderers of Stephen Lawrence, achieved much social media coverage, and he was profiled in The Guardian.

Born to a Greek mother and Jamaican father, he earned a BA degree (2006) in Philosophy and English from the University of Sussex, where he was president of the African Caribbean Society. His poetry, which often deals with questions of identity and social justice, has been featured on BBC Radio 4, and he has been commissioned to write for museums and galleries including the Keats House Museum, the National Portrait Gallery, London, Tate Britain and Tate Modern. In 2018, Atta served as a judge for the BBC Young Writers Award.

In 2019 Atta's verse novel, The Black Flamingo, was published by Hachette UK. For The Black Flamingo, Atta was one of two winners of the Stonewall Book Award 2020 in the Children's and Young Adults category.

Books
I Am Nobody's Nigger, Westborne Press, 2013 (shortlisted for the Polari First Book Prize)
The Black Flamingo, Hachette UK, 2019
 Only On The Weekends, 2022

References

External links
Official site 

Living people
Year of birth missing (living people)
Alumni of the University of Sussex
Black British writers
British people of Greek Cypriot descent
British people of Jamaican descent
British poets
British gay writers
LGBT Black British people
Writers from London
Stonewall Book Award winners
21st-century British male writers
21st-century British LGBT people
English LGBT poets